The 1987 Copa América was the 33rd edition of the Copa América, CONMEBOL's national team competition. It was the first Copa América under the new rotational hosting system. Argentina, as the first country alphabetically, hosted the tournament between 27 June and 12 July. Uruguay successfully defended their title, winning a record 13th Copa América.

Squads

Venues

Group stage
The teams were drawn into three groups, consisting of three teams each. Each team plays once against the other teams in their group and would receive 2 points for a win, 1 point for a draw, 0 points for a loss. The winner of each group advances to the semi-finals. Defending champions Uruguay received a bye into the semi-finals.

Uruguay qualified automatically as holders for the semifinal.

Group A

Group B

Group C

Knockout stage

Semi-finals

Third-place match

Final

Champion

Statistics

Goalscorers 
With four goals, Arnoldo Iguarán is the top scorer in the tournament. In total, 33 goals were scored by 24 different players, with only one of them credited as own goal.

4 goals
  Arnoldo Iguarán

3 goals
  Diego Maradona
  Juan Carlos Letelier

2 goals
  Claudio Caniggia
  Ivo Basay

1 goal

  Careca
  Edú Marangón
  Nelsinho
  Romário
  Fernando Astengo
  Jorge Contreras
  Sergio Salgado
  Jaime Vera
  Juan Jairo Galeano
  Gabriel Gómez
  Bernardo Redín
  Carlos Valderrama
  Hamilton Cuvi
  Eugenio La Rosa
  Luis Reyna
  Antonio Alzamendi
  Pablo Bengoechea
  Pedro Acosta

Own Goal
  Zdenko Morovic

Team of the Tournament 
By El Gráfico.

References 

 
1987 in South American football
Copa América tournaments
International association football competitions hosted by Argentina
Copa América
June 1987 sports events in South America
July 1987 sports events in South America
Sports competitions in Buenos Aires
1980s in Buenos Aires
Sport in Córdoba, Argentina
Sport in Rosario, Santa Fe